Findon (Gaelic: Fionndan, Scots: Finnan) is a fishing village eight miles south of Aberdeen, famous for originating the smoked haddock known as Finnan haddie. The Findon moor has a number of paths through it, many of which run along the cliffs. Deer can often be seen there.  Nearby features include the Portlethen Moss Nature Reserve.

Historical buildings in the area include Elsick House, Gillybrands and Muchalls Castle.

Geography
Findon is a coastal village along the North Sea in the area historically known as Kincardineshire. Somewhat to the south of Findon is the small offshore island of May Craig.

History
The local area was first recorded in medieval history in association with the Causey Mounth.  Findon is situated somewhat east of the ancient Causey Mounth trackway, which road was constructed on high ground to make passable this only available medieval route from coastal points south from Stonehaven to Aberdeen. This ancient passage specifically connected the River Dee crossing (where the present Bridge of Dee is situated) via Portlethen Moss, Muchalls Castle and Stonehaven to the south. The route was that taken by William Keith, 7th Earl Marischal and the Marquess of Montrose when they led a Covenanter army of 9,000 men in the battle of the Civil War in 1639.

See also
Burn of Elsick
Burn of Pheppie
Downies
Portlethen Village

References

External links

 UK National Biodiversity Network - Findon Moor

Villages in Aberdeenshire
Fishing communities in Scotland